The Rabacca Dry River is a river of Saint Vincent and the Grenadines. It is a seasonal river and will only flow like a normal when there is heavy rainfall. It is located on the outskirts of Georgetown. It was formed as a result of the eruption of the La Soufriere volcano, there is its source.

See also
List of rivers of Saint Vincent and the Grenadines

References

 GEOnet Names Server
Tourist Map
Environmental Investigation and Cataloguing, St. Vincent Cross Country Road Project Final Report

Rivers of Saint Vincent and the Grenadines